Hedi Lang (30 October 1931 – 31 March 2004) was a Swiss politician. She was one of the first women to be elected to the Swiss National Council, the first woman elected to a cantonal executive and the second woman to serve as President of the National Council. She was a member of the Social Democratic Party.

Biography
Hedi Lang was born on 30 October 1931 in Uster to Johann Gehri, a cheesemaker from Seedorf, Bern. She married Ernst Lang in 1957 and apprenticed at banks for several years before joining the staff of Die Arbeit, the socialist newspaper where her husband was the editor. In 1961, she joined the Social Democratic Party and in 1970, she was elected to the council of Wetzikon, where she and Ernst moved after their marriage. 

In the 1971 Swiss federal election, women were permitted to vote in federal elections for the first time. Lang was elected to the National Council as one of 10 women that year, the first to serve in the Federal Assembly. She rose to become the president of the parliamentary audit committee and, in 1981, became the President of the National Council, the second woman to hold the presidency after Elisabeth Blunschy in 1977. 

Lang left the National Council in 1983 and was elected to the Executive Council of Zürich and became the first woman to sit on a cantonal executive council. On the council, she was the Director of Justice and Home Affairs. In 1995, she left the council, having successfully shepherded the work on the expansion of Zurich Airport.

Personal life
Lang married Ernst Lang in 1957. Ernst died in 1973.

Hedi Lang died on 31 March 2004 in Zollikerberg, near Zürich.

References

External links 
 Eulogy by Max Binder, President of the National Council

Sources 
KAM 95 International Zurich

1931 births
2004 deaths
Members of the National Council (Switzerland)
Presidents of the National Council (Switzerland)
Women members of the National Council (Switzerland)
People from Uster
People from Wetzikon
Social Democratic Party of Switzerland politicians
20th-century Swiss women politicians
20th-century Swiss politicians